Seer is a Chinese video game series and media franchise, including a cartoon series and film series.

Seer, which is an acronym for Space Energy Robot,  involves cartoon monsters (called 精灵) fighting one another, similar to the gameplay of Pokémon.

Characters

The game revolves Space Energy Robots that acquire monsters and go on missions. Most Seers are playable characters in the game. Some monsters include:

Akexiya (阿克西亚)
Moshidilu (魔狮迪露)
Puni (谱尼)
Leiyi (雷伊) is an Electric-type Legendary elf introduced in Seer. As the second patron saint of Panor Galaxy and king of the new generations of electric-type elves, he created the Thunder Guard and leads the God of War alliance to protect the entire Seer System. Because of his fascinating appearance and a variety of powerful skills, he becomes one of the hottest monster in Seer series.
Gaiya (盖亚)
Bokeer (波克尔)
Pipi (皮皮)
Hamoleite (哈莫雷特)
Menghuwang (猛虎王)

Film series

References

External links
Seer - TaoMee (上海淘米网络科技有限公司) 

2009 video games
Chinese animated television series
Video games about robots
Video games developed in China
Television articles with incorrect naming style
Animated series based on video games
Role-playing video games